Anti Anti (Remixes) is a single by the band Bonaparte in collaboration with electronic music producer Markus Lange. It offers a collection of electro, techno and minimal remixes of "Anti Anti", from the band's debut album Too Much. It was released by Freakz Me Out label in 2009.

Track listing

Digital download
"Anti Anti" (Markus Lange Re-Edit) – 5:57
"Anti Anti" (Jaimie Fanatic Remix) – 6:10
"Anti Anti" (Jaymo Remix) – 5:00
"Anti Anti" (Mimo Remix) – 5:14
"Anti Anti" (Stereofunk Remix) – 5:38
"Anti Anti" (Maxcherry Remix feat. Brian Lindsay) – 5:35
"Anti Anti" (K-Paul Remix) – 5:20
"Anti Anti" (Markus Lange Dub) – 5:55
"Anti Anti" (Disco Trash Music Remix) – 4:35
"Anti Anti" (Stevanez & Juls Remix) – 7:56

12" Vinyl
Side A
"Anti Anti" (Markus Lange Re-Edit) – 5:57
"Anti Anti" (K-Paul Remix) – 5:20
Side B
"Anti Anti" (Jaymo Remix) – 5:00
"Anti Anti" (Jaimie Fanatic Remix) – 6:10

References

2009 singles
2008 songs